Kmeťovo is a village and municipality in the Nové Zámky District in the Nitra Region of south-west Slovakia.

History
In historical records the village was first mentioned in 1214

Geography
The village lies at an altitude of 134 metres and covers an area of 5.196 km². It has a population of about 960 people.

Ethnicity
The population is 100% Slovak.

Facilities
The village has a public library, football pitch and Catholic church.

Catholic church
The Catholic church was built in 1882, and it was a part of the parish of Michal nad Zitavou, a village and municipality in the Nové Zámky District in the Nitra Region of southwest Slovakia.

Considered to be an important historical monument for people in Kmetovo, Slovakia, this Roman Catholic church was dedicated in 1994 as Our Lady of the Rosary.  The church was designed in a classical style, with construction being completed in 1882. Due to the water-logged soils of the marsh that the church was built on, several attempts were made at creating a drainage area behind the church, but to no avail. The church then underwent extensive reconstruction in 1942 to stabilize its construction and solve the drainage problem. An extension to the church was completed in 1994. In 2001, the church interior and exterior was repainted, the roof was replaced, and a gilded cross was added to its spire.

Genealogical resources

The records for genealogical research are available at the state archive "Statny Archiv in Nitra, Slovakia"

 Roman Catholic church records (births/marriages/deaths): 1722-1896 (parish B)

See also
 List of municipalities and towns in Slovakia

References

External links
https://web.archive.org/web/20071006173841/http://www.statistics.sk/mosmis/eng/run.html
Kmeťovo – Nové Zámky Okolie
Surnames of living people in Kmetovo

Villages and municipalities in Nové Zámky District